Platydoris rolani is a species of sea slug, a dorid nudibranch, shell-less marine opisthobranch gastropod mollusks in the family Discodorididae.

Distribution
This species was described from Príncipe Island, Gulf of Guinea. The original description contains additional specimens from São Tomé.

References

Discodorididae
Gastropods described in 2002